"Bigger Than Me" is a single by the Irish indie rock quintet, Bell X1, and the first to be taken from the band's third album Flock. It was released on 30 September 2005 in Ireland and 10 October 2005 in the UK. It entered the Irish Singles Chart on 6 October 2005, spending two weeks there and peaking at #16.

Track listings 

CDS 987389-0/LC00407
 "Bigger Than Me" - (3:50)
 "Still Selling Shoes" - (3:23)
 "My First Born For a Song" - (video)

Chart performance

References

External links 
 Bell X1 on irishmusiccentral.com

2005 singles
Bell X1 (band) songs
2005 songs
Island Records singles
Songs written by Brian Crosby (composer)
Songs written by David Geraghty
Songs written by Paul Noonan